Corey Milton Whitely (born 11 July 1991) is an English professional footballer who plays as a forward for Bromley.

Career
Whitely began his senior career at Boreham Wood, where he played a handful of games in the 2008–09 season. After three seasons playing in the non-pyramid TTFF League for Yalova, in which he was top scorer, Whitely joined Isthmian League side Waltham Forest for the 2012–13 season. Whitely joined Cheshunt in January 2013, before moving up a division to join Enfield Town that summer. He scored 46 goals for Town over three seasons before moving up to the National League to join Dagenham & Redbridge in summer 2016. He won the Daggers' player of the season award the following summer before joining Ebbsfleet United in February 2018.

On 25 June 2019 Whitely joined Newport County on a two-year deal. He made his EFL League Two debut on the opening day of the 2019–20 season against Mansfield Town. On 4 September 2019 he scored his first goal for Newport in the 5–4 defeat to West Ham United Under-21s in the EFL Trophy Southern Group E. On 10 January 2020 Whitely joined Bromley on loan for the remainder of the 2019–20 season. On 20 August 2020 Whitely rejoined Boreham Wood on loan for the 2020–21 season. On 4 June 2021 it was announced that he would leave Newport County at the end of the season, following the expiry of his contract. Whitely joined Bromley permanently in July 2021.

Career statistics

Honours
Bromley
FA Trophy: 2021–22

References

1991 births
Living people
English footballers
Footballers from Enfield, London
Association football forwards
Boreham Wood F.C. players
Waltham Forest F.C. players
Cheshunt F.C. players
Enfield Town F.C. players
Dagenham & Redbridge F.C. players
Ebbsfleet United F.C. players
Newport County A.F.C. players
Bromley F.C. players
National League (English football) players
Isthmian League players